There are 24 Grade II* listed buildings in the City of Coventry. In the United Kingdom, a listed building is a building or structure of special historical or architectural importance. These buildings are legally protected from demolition, as well as from any extensions or alterations that would adversely affect the building's character or destroy historic features. Listed buildings are divided into three categories—Grade I buildings are buildings of "exceptional" interest, Grade II buildings are buildings of special interest, and Grade II* buildings are Grade II buildings that are of particular interest. Coventry is an ancient city and a metropolitan borough in the West Midlands of England. The city's history dates back to at least the 11th century (CE), and it was a thriving centre of commerce in mediaeval times.

The oldest building on this list is St Lawrence's Church—originally built in the 14th century—and the newest are the Houses for Visiting Mathematicians at the University of Warwick, completed in 1969. Sir William Reid Dick's sculpture of ancient Coventry noblewoman Lady Godiva is the city's only other Grade II* listed building from the 20th century. There are no Grade II* listed buildings in Coventry from the 13th, 17th, or 21st centuries, but there is at least one from every other century between 1100 and 2000. Of those, more buildings (six) date to the 14th century than any other, though five were built in the 16th century. The construction date of two buildings—the Mediaeval Stone Building on Much Park Street and the basement of the former Old Starr Inn—are not known, though both date from the Middle Ages.

Many of the buildings have changed use over their lifetime. Five are or were churches or chapels, of which four remain places of worship. The fifth, Christchurch Steeple, was originally part of a 13th-century friary and served as a church until it was mostly destroyed in World War II bombing, which left only the steeple. The building is now a popular bar. Four other Grade II* listed buildings in the city are pubs or bars, or were at some point in their history.

Grade II* listed buildings

|}

See also

History of Coventry
Scheduled Ancient Monuments in Coventry
Grade I listed buildings in Coventry
Grade II* listed buildings in the West Midlands

Notes

References

 
Listed
Buildings and structures in Coventry
Lists of listed buildings in the West Midlands (county)